The 2013 AVP Pro Beach Volleyball Tour was a domestic professional beach volleyball circuit organized in the United States by the Association of Volleyball Professionals (AVP) for the 2013 beach volleyball season.

Schedule

This is the complete schedule of events on the 2013 calendar, with team progression documented from the semifinals stage. All tournaments consisted of single-elimination qualifying rounds followed by a double-elimination main draw.

Men

Women

Milestones and events
Miscellaneous
The 2013 season was the AVP's first full season under new CEO Donald Sun.

Points distribution

Awards
The 2013 AVP year-end award winners were announced on November 19. The season's top performers were chosen based on statistics, player votes and AVP national ranking points earned during the year.

References

Association of Volleyball Professionals
AVP Pro Beach Volleyball Tour